Tsinghua University High School, or Tsinghua High School for short, is a high school in China, located in Beijing. Based on its current status, a more precise translation should be 'The secondary school affiliated to Tsinghua University'. In a 2016 ranking of Chinese high schools that send students to study in American universities, Tsinghua University High School ranked number 10 in mainland China in terms of the number of students entering top American universities.

History

The Cheng Zhi School (1915-1952)
The Qinghua Fuzhong was named Cheng Zhi School when it is founded in 1915, consisting of elementary grades and a kindergarten.

In 1939, Cheng Zhi school, together with Tsinghua University, moved to Kunming following the Japanese invasion and became part of the joint secondary school of the National Southwestern Associated University. The school moved back to Beijing in 1946 after the war and became a combined middle/elementary school.

Rename and reorganization (1952-1960)
 In 1952, the middle school part of Cheng Zhi and the middle school affiliated to Yenching University merged and formed the Tsinghua University Fushe Zhongxue (清华大学附设中学, Zhongxue as an add-on to Tsinghua University).
 In 1958, the preparatory school established in 1951, intended to prepare cadre workers and farmers for education in the university, was merged into Fushe Zhongxue.
 In 1960, Tsinghua University backed a further expansion of Qinghua Fuzhong, for the first time established its high-school section, and gave it its current name.

Prosperity (1960-1966)
The reason why Tsinghua invested in and reorganized Qinghua Fuzhong came from the university's own problem with its incoming students: many of them excelled in nothing but exams. To solve this problem, Tsinghua decided to prepare its incoming students themselves.
 
While other Middle and High schools in Beijing are administered by the local government, Tsinghua University directly appoints the headmaster and other keynote figures of Qinghua Fuzhong and backs it with financial support. Students are freed from repetitive training of exam questions, instead, they are encouraged to learn foreign language, participate in sports, and art performances. On top of that, born and bred in families of university faculty members and high-level government officials, most of the students in Qinghua Fuzhong already comes with good education.

The Cultural Revolution (1966-1978)
After Mao Zedong drew the line between bourgeois and proletarian, the war between children of university faculties and those of Party officials began. On May29th, 1966, the first Red Guard organization was established among Qinghua Fuzhong students who felt ill-treated by the school during its effort to stop the war. 
On June 2, the first 'big-character poster' signed by a 'Red Guard' is posted on the classroom building, declaring that they will fight with 'mid-age bourgeois' until they are destroyed. Apparently the mid-age bourgeois refers to the school's administration, which is appointed by the university.

In mid June, Red Guards start to publicly criticize and denounce the school headmaster and other faculty members.

The Red Guards took control of the school in August.

Split and reunion (1978-)
In 1978, the students came back after the 'Down to the Countryside Movement'.  To accommodate them, Qinghua Fuzhong Erbu (清华附中二部), a new school later renamed to Qinghua Er Fuzhong (Second Zhongxue affiliated to Tsinghua) was founded, offering only middle school grades. In 1984, the middle school section from Qinghua Fuzhong was relocated into Qinghua Er Fuzhong, making Qinghua Fuzhong a dedicated high school.

15 years later, in 1999, the Er Fuzhong moved into newly completed buildings inside the campus of Qinghua Fuzhong. In 2003, the registration of Qinghua Er Fuzhong was cancelled and merged back into Qinghua Fuzhong. By then Qinghua Fuzhong was already known as the 'high school' of Tsinghua.

International School
In the 2009 school year an international school affiliated to Tsinghua Fuzhong opened, called Tsinghua International School or THIS. It is tied to and shares facilities with Tsinghua Fuzhong but remains an independent school. The school has around 430 students from grades 1-12. The colleges attended by alumni are impressive for a small school, including names like Columbia, Brown and MIT.

Location
The school is located in the northern part of picturesque Tsinghua University campus, close to the famous Old Summer Palace in the west, and next to Yuanmingyuan Park.  The laboratories, teaching devices, the library and the swimming pool of the university are used by the students. Over half the pupils of the school live on the campus.

Faculty
Many scholars worked in the school such as scientists Prof. Zhou Peiyuan and Qian Weichang, philosopher Prof. Feng Youlan, literati Mr. Zhu Ziqing and language educationist Mr. Zhang Xiong. Scholars and academicians from Tsinghua University, Peking University and the Chinese Academy of Sciences and other institutions of higher learning have been invited to the school to give lectures and instructions.

A group of professors from Tsinghua University teach the pupils of “senior middle school science experimental class” and “John Ma athletic class” of the school.

Some of the school's teachers have been commended by the Education Ministry, Beijing municipal government, Haidian District authority and Tsinghua University. Mr. Xu Zhong-yuan, the vice-principal, won the title of outstanding teacher of Beijing municipality. Ms. Zhou Jie, another vice-principal has the title of outstanding moral education worker of Beijing municipality.  Mr. Xie Juzhao, Ms. Han Qingying, Mr. Li Xuesen, and Ms. Li Zeng-ling are commended as excellent teachers in charge of a class in Beijing municipality awarded “Forbidden Cup”.

Achievement in teaching and training
Since 1983, the high school graduates have entered institutes of higher learning every year, and 100% of the pupils entered college, among them, more than 1000 graduates entered Tsinghua University and Peking University. Since 1988, at the international middle school pupils' "Olympic" competitions of mathematics, physics, chemistry, biology and information science, 16 students of the school have altogether won 18 prize medals, among them, 13 are gold ones. At the international and national games of middle school students', students of the school have won 36 medals, among them, 7 are gold medals and 21 are silver medals. 14 students of the school have won the gold-sail and silver-sail prize of Beijing municipality successively.

The honor titles the school has won are: 
 "The advanced school of moral education" (1988) and “the nationwide advanced school of experimental training after school” (1993) entitled by the Ministry of National Education.
 “The advanced school achieving remarkable successes in an all-round way teaching and training the top pupils who do well in some of the courses” (1993) and “the model school coming up to the demanded standards of physical education” (1996) entitled by Beijing municipality.
 “The advanced school of the popularization of experiment teaching”(1996) and “the experimental school of education modernization project” (1996) entitled by Haidian District educational authority.

Events
From August 3–8, 2005, Tsinghua High was invited to join the Hong Kong International Model United Nations (HKIMUN2005), together with four other mainland China high schools. Its two delegations were awarded "Best delegation" and "Best delegation mention".

Notable alumni
Chen Luyu, Phoenix TV hostess
Duan Yongji, President of Stone Group
Li Deping, researcher at the Academia Sinica
Li Eding, researcher at the Chinese Academy of Engineering)
Liu Yandong, Vice-director of the United Front Department of the Central Committee of the Communist Party of China
Lu Jun, football referee
Shi Tiesheng, writer
Wu Xiaoyan, musician
Yang Wei, Tsinghua University professor
Zhang Chengzhi, writer
Zhang Hongmin, CCTV announcer
Zhang Yitang, mathematician

Sister schools
 St. Paul's Co-educational College, Hong Kong, China
 Gig Harbor High School, Washington, United States
 Potomac School, Virginia, United States
 Schule Schloss Salem, Germany
 Lycée Louis-le-Grand, France
 Brighton College, United Kingdom

Official Website:
http://www.qhfz.edu.cn/

References
Footnotes

Tsinghua University
High schools in Beijing
Tsinghua University
Educational institutions established in 1915
1915 establishments in China